Spiroxatrine is a drug which acts as a selective antagonist at both the 5-HT1A receptor and the α2C adrenergic receptor. It is an analog of spiperone and also has some dopamine antagonist effects.

References

5-HT1A antagonists
Abandoned drugs
Alpha-2 blockers
Benzodioxans
Dopamine antagonists
Imidazolidinones
Spiro compounds